Lucius II: The Prophecy is a psychological horror stealth sandbox game developed and published by Shiver Games for Microsoft Windows. It serves as a loose sequel to the game Lucius. Focusing on addressing the criticisms of linearity in the original Lucius, Lucius II offers players a variety of ways to complete their objectives. Players are given the supernatural powers of Mind Control, Telekinesis, and Pyrokinesis to use as they wish. Killing NPCs and finding secrets scattered throughout levels allows players to level up in order to upgrade and earn new supernatural powers. The plot focuses on Lucius being sent to the psychiatric ward of St. Benedict's Hospital where he must escape to the nearby town of Ludlow. Along the way, he is assisted by Detective McGuffin, who realizes Lucius's true potential.

Announced on 8 August 2014 and later released in February 2015, it received mixed-negative reception from critics. Criticisms were pointed at the game's lack of polish, high amount of bugs, and broken artificial intelligence. A sequel, titled Lucius III, was released on 13 December 2018.

Reception 

Lucius II received "mixed or average" reviews according to review aggregator Metacritic.

References

External links 

2015 video games
Video games about demons
Fiction about the Devil
Indie video games
Psychological horror games
Stealth video games
Video games developed in Finland
Windows games
Single-player video games
Open-world video games
Video game sequels
Video games set in 1974